The 2021–22 Lebanese Premier League was the 60th season of the Lebanese Premier League, the top Lebanese professional league for association football clubs since its establishment in 1934. The league started on 11 September 2021 and ended on 4 June 2022.

It was the second season to feature a "split" format, following its introduction in the 2020–21 season, in which the season was divided into two phases. Ahed won their eighth league title undefeated. Defending champions Ansar, who won their 14th title in 2020–21, finished second. Sporting, who were newly promoted, and Shabab Bourj, who withdrew from the league, were relegated to the Lebanese Second Division.

Summary

Regulations 
Each club had to involve one player under the age of 22 for at least 600 minutes, two players for at least 800 combined minutes, and three players for at least 1,200 combined minutes. Also, each club was allowed a maximum of eight players over the age of 30, with only five being able to be fielded in a game. In case a club was to not meet the required number of minutes at the end of the season, they would have three points deducted from their total in the league.

Due to the economic situation in Lebanon, no foreign players were allowed to play in the league in the first half of the season. In the second half, teams were allowed to contract one foreign player, for the first time since October 2019.

Format 
Following its introduction in the 2020–21 season, the 2021–22 season consisted of two phases: in the first phase, each team played against one another once. In the second phase, the 12 teams were divided into two groups based on their position in the first phase; the teams carried over their point tally from the first phase. After the first phase was completed, clubs could not move out of their own half in the league, even if they achieved more or fewer points than a higher or lower ranked team, respectively.

The top six teams played against each other twice, as opposed to the previous season where they played each other once; the champion automatically qualified to the 2023–24 AFC Champions League qualifying play-offs—assuming they met the criteria set by the Asian Football Confederation (AFC). The runners-up instead directly qualified to the 2023–24 AFC Cup group stage—as long as the champions met the AFC criteria for the AFC Champions League. The bottom six teams also played against each other twice, with the bottom two teams being relegated to the Lebanese Second Division.

Events 
Following Nejmeh's refusal to play Ahed on 9 January 2022, the Lebanese Football Association (LFA) decided to assign a 3–0 walkover win to Ahed, deducted 6 points from Nejmeh, and fined them £L10 million. Nejmeh's decision not to play came as a form of protest against the refereeing in their game against Tadamon Sour one week prior.

Following Shabab Bourj's failure to comply to FIFA's request for them to compensate former player Lorougnon Christ Remi, and rumours of a merger with Safa, the club withdrew from the league. On 30 May 2022, the LFA announced that Shabab Bourj were fined £L12.5 million, were relegated to the Second Division, and that all of their matches in the championship round were voided.

Teams 

Twelve teams competed in the league – the top ten teams from the 2020–21 Lebanese Premier League season and the two teams promoted from the Lebanese Second Division.

Stadiums and locations 

Prior to the start of each season, every team chose two stadiums as their home venues. In case both stadiums were unavailable for a certain matchday, another venue was used.

Note: Table lists in alphabetical order.

Foreign players 
Lebanese clubs were allowed to contract a foreign player for the second half of the season.

League table

Season statistics

Scoring

Top goalscorers

Hat-tricks 

Notes
4 Player scored 4 goals

Most assists

Clean sheets

Notes

References

External links 

 

Lebanese Premier League seasons
Lebanon
1